Miss Universe 1958, the 7th Miss Universe pageant, was held on 25 July 1958 in Long Beach, California, United States. 36 contestants competed where finally, Miss Colombia, 19-year-old Luz Marina Zuluaga won the competition, and was crowned by Gladys Zender of Peru.

Results

Placements

Contestants

  Alaska - Eleanor Moses
  - Celina Mercedes Ayala
  - Astrid Tanda Lindholm
  - Liliane Taelemans †
  - Adalgisa Colombo †
  - Clyo Fernandes
  - Eileen Cindy Conroy
  - Raquel Molina Urrutia †
  - Luz Marina Zuluaga †
  - Eugenia María Valverde Guardia
  - Arminia Pérez y González
  - Evy Norlund
  - Alicia Vallejo Eljuri
  - Dorothy Hazeldine
  - Monique Boulinguez
  - Marlies Jung Behrens
  - Marily Kalimopoulou
  - Maya Glinz
  Hawaii - Geri Hoo †
  - Corine Rottschäfer †
  - Miriam Hadar
  - Clara Copella
  - Tomoko Moritake
  - Oh Geum-soon
  - Elvira Leticia Risser Corredor
  - Greta Andersen
  - Graciela Scorza Leguizamón
  - Beatriz Boluarte
  - Alicja Bobrzowska
  Singapore - Marion Willis
  - Gertrud Gummels
  - Birgitta Elisabeth Gårdman
  - Irene Augustyniak
  - Eurlyne Howell
  - Ida Margarita Pieri
  - Angela Tong

Notes

Did not compete
  - Hanni Ehrenstrasser
  - Louisa Benson Craig
  - Carmen Remedios Tuazon

Awards
  - Miss Friendship (Tomoko Moritake)
  - Miss Photogenic (Corine Rottschäfer)
  - Most Popular Girl (Astrid Tanda Lindholm)

References

External links
 Miss Universe official website

1958
1958 in California
1958 beauty pageants
Beauty pageants in the United States
July 1958 events in the United States